Upper White Castle Farmhouse, Llantilio Crossenny, Monmouthshire is a farmhouse dating from the late 17th century. Standing adjacent to the White Castle, the farmhouse is constructed in a Renaissance style. The farmhouse is Grade II* listed, and some of the related farm buildings have their own listings.

History and description
The farmhouse dates from the late 17th century. In a mid-Victorian tithe map the farm is listed as the property of Henry Clifford. The property remains the farmhouse of a privately owned farm. The house is of five bays with a hipped roof and has been substantially modernised. The interior is "well-preserved" and Cadw notes the presence of an "exceptionally fine dog-leg staircase". The farmhouse is Grade II* listed, and the cider house and pigsty have their own Grade II listings.

Notes

Grade II* listed buildings in Monmouthshire
Country houses in Wales
Grade II* listed houses in Wales
Farmhouses in Wales